Hippoidea is a superfamily of decapod crustaceans known as sand crabs or mole crabs.

Ecology
Hippoids are adapted to burrowing into sandy beaches, a habit they share with raninid crabs, and the parallel evolution of the two groups is striking. In the family Hippidae, the body is almost ovoid, the first pereiopods have no claws, and the telson is long, none of which are seen in related groups. Unlike most other decapods, sand crabs cannot walk; instead, they use their legs to dig into the sand. Members of the family Hippidae beat their uropods to swim.

Apart from the polar regions, hippoids can be found on beaches throughout the world. Larvae of one species have also been found in Antarctic waters, despite the lack of suitable sandy beaches in the Antarctic.

Classification
Alongside hermit crabs and allies (Paguroidea), squat lobsters and allies (Galatheoidea) and the hairy stone crab (Lomis hirta, Lomisoidea), Hippoidea is one of the four groups that make up the infraorder Anomura. Of the four, Hippoidea is thought to be the most basal, with the other three groups being more closely related to each other than to Hippoidea.

The fossil record of sand crabs is sparse, but extends back to the Cretaceous period. Sand crabs are placed in three families (exclusively fossil taxa are marked †):

Albuneidae Stimpson, 1858
Albunea Weber, 1795
Austrolepidopa Efford & Haig, 1968
Harryhausenia Boyko, 2004 †
Italialbunea Boyko, 2002 †
Lepidopa Stimpson, 1858
Leucolepidopa Efford, 1969
Paralbunea Serène, 1977
Paraleucolepidopa Calado, 1996
Praealbunea Fraaije, 2002 †
Squillalbunea Boyko, 2002
Stemonopa Efford & Haig, 1968
Zygopa Holthuis, 1961

Blepharipodidae Boyko, 2002
Blepharipoda Randall, 1840
Lophomastix Benedict, 1904
Hippidae Latreille, 1825
Emerita Scopoli, 1777
Hippa Fabricius, 1787
Mastigochirus Miers, 1878

References

External links

 
Anomura
Extant Maastrichtian first appearances
Arthropod superfamilies